Jamaica competed at the 2014 Winter Olympics in Sochi, Russia from 7 to 23 February 2014. The team consisted of a two-man bobsled, marking the return of the Jamaican Bobsled Team to the Winter Olympics after a twelve-year hiatus.

Competitors

Bobsleigh 

Jamaica qualified one sled for competition. The team lacked funding, so the cryptocurrency Dogecoin community raised on the team's behalf $30,000 of the approximately $40,000 required within two days. An additional $80,000 was raised in online donations through Crowdtilt before 21 January. As of 15:50, 21 January 2014 (UTC), the campaign had raised $121,160 far surpassing the target of only $80,000. The Jamaican team finished the first two runs in 30th (and last) position. The next day they finished the third run in 29th place (also in last, because the Serbian team had withdrawn to injury). This meant they failed to advance to the final run and finished in 29th overall. With two athletes competing in a single event, the country did not win a medal at these Games.

* – Denotes the driver of each sled

References

External links 

Jamaica at the 2014 Winter Olympics 

Nations at the 2014 Winter Olympics
2014
2014 in Jamaican sport